Sauviac is the name of several communes in France:

 Sauviac, Gers, in the Gers department
 Sauviac, Gironde, in the Gironde department